The PF-89 or Type 89 is a portable, disposable, unguided, shoulder-launched, anti-tank rocket-propelled rocket launcher. Developed by Norinco for People's Liberation Army, PF-89 was designed to replace the obsolete Type 69 RPG, providing a man-portable, single-use assault weapon system that could be used mainly by infantry squads to engage and defeat light armor and bunkers.

The design permits accurate delivery of a rocket-propelled 80mm high-explosive anti-tank (HEAT) warhead, with negligible recoil. PF-89 entered mass production in 1993, and generally replaced Type 69 RPG in PLA throughout the 1990s. Since 2010, the system is being used along with the more advanced Type 08 recoilless gun.

Description
The PF-89 is a lightweight, self-contained, anti-armor weapon comparable to the Swedish AT4 (U.S. Designation M136). Unlike AT4, PF-89 is a rocket-propelled weapon instead of a recoilless gun which by design is more similar to M72 LAW and RPG-26. The weapon consists of a free-flight, fin-stabilized, rocket-propelled cartridge packed in a one-piece, one-off, fiberglass-wrapped tube.

It is man-portable and is fired from the right shoulder only. The launcher is watertight for ease of transportation and storage. The PF-89 has a simple 2.5x, 12° field of view optical sight for aiming, with no night combat ability.

The firer must be able to see and identify the target and estimate the range to it. The round of ammunition is self-contained in a disposable launch tube. The system weighs only eight pounds and can be used effectively with minimal training.

However, the problem of back blast became prominent after the Army adopted the PF-89. Collateral damage is especially concerning for PLA that uses motorized infantry fighting tactics. China developed the Type 08 multipurpose recoilless gun with countermass balance mechanism to replace the PF-89, especially the multipurpose PF89A variant.

Variants
The PF-89 has six variants with each variant corresponding to a specific type of ammunition. The earliest variant, simply called PF-89, uses high-explosive double shaped charges (with 8701 explosives) to achieve 628mm of RHA penetration at 90° angle in the static test. In kinetic test, the RHA penetration is more than 400mm at 0° angle or 180mm at 68° angle.

The second variant, PF-89A, employs specialized multipurpose incendiary rounds. The multipurpose round can penetrate 300 mm of reinforced concrete, and release steel fragments and zirconium-based incendiary composition to kill targets, light up wood, fabric upon impact.

The third variant, PF-89B or PF-89-1, uses tandem-charge high-explosive anti-tank warheads to improve penetration against reactive armour.

The WPF-89-1 is the thermobaric version of the PF-89. WPF-89-1 is reusable, but did not see much use due to the complex reload process, thus China developed improved single-use WPF-89-2 in 2003.

A training replica version is also available for operation practice.

Users

 : Used by the Cambodian Army.
 : People's Liberation Army

Non-state actors
 : WPF 89-2s used by Fajr Libya

See also
 PF-98
 DZJ-08
 M72 LAW
 M136
 RPG-26
 Kestrel (rocket launcher)

References

External links
 PF-89 at SinoDefence

Cold War weapons of China
Weapons of the People's Republic of China
Anti-tank rockets
Military equipment introduced in the 1990s